Grumant is a former Soviet company town in Svalbard, Norway, established in 1912 and abandoned in 1965. The population—including Coles Bay, which served the settlement's port—peaked at 1,106 in 1951. The name Grumant is of Pomory origin, and is also used to refer to the whole of the Svalbard archipelago. It may be a corruption of Greenland, with which the land was confused.

References

1912 establishments in Norway
1961 disestablishments in Norway
Company towns in Norway
Former populated places in Svalbard
Spitsbergen
Norway–Soviet Union relations